The James Craig Watson Medal was established by the bequest of James Craig Watson, an astronomer the University of Michigan between 1863 and 1879, and is awarded every 1-4 years by the U.S. National Academy of Sciences for contributions to astronomy.

Recipients

Source:National Academy of Sciences

See also

 List of astronomy awards
 List of awards named after people

References

Watson
Awards established in 1887
Awards of the United States National Academy of Sciences
1887 establishments in the United States